Andrey Yusipets (born 16 April 1967) is a Belarusian professional football coach and a former player. As of 2013, he is a youth coach at FC Gomel.

External links
 

1967 births
Living people
Soviet footballers
Belarusian footballers
Association football forwards
Belarus international footballers
Belarusian expatriate footballers
Expatriate footballers in Germany
Belarusian football managers
Belarusian Premier League players
FC Gomel players
Alemannia Aachen players
FC Gomel managers
FC ZLiN Gomel players
FC Rechitsa-2014 players